Nova Southeastern University (NSU or, informally, Nova) is a private research university with its main campus in Fort Lauderdale-Davie, Florida. The university consists of 14 total colleges, centers, and schools offering over 150 programs of study. The university offers professional degrees in the social sciences, law, business, osteopathic medicine, allopathic medicine, allied health, pharmacy, dentistry, optometry, physical therapy, education, occupational therapy, and nursing. As of 2019, 20,576 students were enrolled at Nova Southeastern University, with more than 170,000 alumni. With a main campus located on 314 acres in Davie, Florida, NSU operates additional campuses in Dania Beach, North Miami Beach, Tampa Bay-Clearwater and centers throughout the state of Florida. There is also a center in San Juan, Puerto Rico.

The university was founded in 1964 as the Nova University of Advanced Technology on a former naval outlying landing field built during World War II and first offered graduate degrees in the physical and social sciences. In 1994, the university merged with the Southeastern University of the Health Sciences and assumed its current name.

NSU is classified among "R2: Doctoral Universities – High research activity"; it also classified as a "community engaged" university by the Carnegie Foundation for the Advancement of Teaching. The university is accredited by the Southern Association of Colleges and Schools and also has numerous additional specialized accreditations for its colleges and programs.

Nova Southeastern University's intercollegiate athletic teams are collectively known as the Nova Southeastern Sharks and compete in Division II of the National Collegiate Athletic Association. The Sharks have won eight NCAA national championships.

History

1960s 

The university, originally named Nova University of Advanced Technology, was chartered by the state of Florida on December 4, 1964. The name comes from the site where the Nova Education Experiment was conducted, a project funded in part by the Ford Foundation and the federal government with the goal of creating a series of schools spanning elementary to university-level education. With an inaugural class of 17 students, the university opened as a graduate school for the social and physical sciences. The university was originally located on a campus in downtown Fort Lauderdale but later moved to its current campus in Davie, Florida. A portion of the site of this campus was once a naval training airfield during World War II, called the "Naval Outlying Landing Field Forman". The remnants of the taxiway surrounding the airfield are still present in the form of roads used on the campus. After World War II, the federal government made a commitment to the Forman family, from whom the land was purchased, that the land would only be used for educational purposes. This led the land to be used for the creation of the South Florida Education Center, which includes Nova Southeastern University, as well as Broward College, McFatter Technical College, and satellite campuses of Florida Atlantic University and the University of Florida.

1970s 

On June 23, 1970, the board of trustees voted to enter into a federation with the New York Institute of Technology (NYIT). The president of NYIT, Alexander Schure, PhD, became chancellor of Nova University, and Abraham S. Fischler became the president of the university. The university charter was amended and "of Advanced Technology" was dropped from its corporate name. In 1971, Nova University received accreditation from the Southern Association of Colleges and Schools (SACS).

In 1972, the university introduced its first off-campus course of study in education. In 1974, NSU opened a law school, with an inaugural class of 175 students. The law school was named after one of the university's founders, Shepard Broad. The same year, the university began offering evening courses on campus for undergraduates, and changed its name to Nova University. The following year, in 1975, the law school received approval from the American Bar Association.

1980s 

In the early 1980s, the university received a $16 million gift from the Leo Goodwin Sr. Trust. In 1985, NSU ended its collaboration with NYIT and began offering its first online classes. In 1989, enrollment reached 8,000 students, with nearly 25,000 alumni.

In 1981, outside of Nova University, a group of osteopathic physicians, wanting to enhance medical education in the region, established the Southeastern College of Osteopathic Medicine in North Miami Beach. This was the first osteopathic medical school established in the southeastern United States.

Rapid expansion over the course of the decade also resulted in the addition of several new programs at Southeastern College. Pharmacy and optometry, amongst other programs, were added to the school. The school then renamed itself into the Southeastern University of the Health Sciences.

1990s 

During the 1990s, both Nova University and Southeastern University expanded, adding a dentistry program and increasing distance education programs. In 1994, Nova University merged with Southeastern University of the Health Sciences to form Nova Southeastern University (NSU), adding the colleges of osteopathic medicine, pharmacy, optometry and allied health to the university. Following the merger, many of the health programs relocated to their current location on the Davie campus. In 1993, the Miami Dolphins opened a training center on campus.

2000s 
The William and Norma Horvitz Administration Building, a two-story  postmodern structure, was built at a cost of $3 million, which houses the office of the president and numerous other administration departments. In 2001, the Alvin Sherman Library for Research and Information Technology Center was completed and also serves as the largest public library facility in the state of Florida. In 2004, the Carl DeSantis Building opened at a cost of $33 million, which houses the H. Wayne Huizenga School of Business and Entrepreneurship.

In 2006, the  University Center opened, which includes a 5,400-seat arena, a fitness center, a performance theater, art gallery, a food court, and a student lounge. In 2007, a 501-bed residence hall called "The Commons" opened.

The university attracted negative attention in 2006 when it ended a contract with subcontractor UNICCO after more than 350 of its employees, almost all of them minorities, opted to unionize with SEIU; the university's action contrasted with the reactions of the administrations of other south Florida universities to the organization of their janitorial staff.

In 2008, NSU, in partnership with the National Coral Reef Institute and the International Coral Reef Symposium, held the largest coral reef symposium in the world, which included representation from 75 countries in attendance. In 2008, the Museum of Art Fort Lauderdale joined the university. Originally founded in 1986 and located in Fort Lauderdale, the museum focuses on contemporary art work, particularly of the cultures of South Florida and Latin America. The NSU Art Museum is based in a 83,000 square-foot building, with a 256-seat auditorium and permanent collection of more than 7,000 works.

2010s
In 2014, NSU opened a new campus in Puerto Rico, with master and doctoral programs. In April 2015, NSU announced a significant restructuring of its schools and colleges, adopting an all-college framework, to take effect the following July. Two new colleges were established: the Dr. Kiran C. Patel College of Allopathic Medicine and the Farquhar Honors College. The inaugural class of the medical school consisted of 53 students, with courses commencing on July 30, 2018. The college became South Florida's fourth traditional (allopathic) medical school.

In January 2018, the university opened the NSU Write from the Start Writing and Communication Center in the Alvin Sherman Library on the main campus in Davie. The center offers writing and communication assistance to all NSU students as part of the university's Quality Enhancement Plan, which is part of reaccreditation through the Southern Association of Colleges and Schools Commission on Colleges.

Following a $50 million donation from the Kiran C Patel Foundation, NSU's Tampa Bay campus was relocated to Clearwater. It now houses the second DO degree program, which accepted its first class in fall 2019, along with several additional allied health programs.

George L. Hanbury II is the sixth and current president of Nova Southeastern University, and assumed the position of president in January 2010.

2020s
In 2020, NSU announced the establishment of the Alan B. Levan NSU Broward Center of Innovation, scheduled to open in July 2021.

In March 2020, NSU received criticism for hosting 150 visitors on campus during the COVID-19 pandemic, despite known cases of confirmed COVID-19 on campus at the time. Two weeks prior, six cases were identified in individuals who traveled to Ireland as part of a school-affiliated trip. 

In July 2020, the U.S. Department of Labor Office of Federal Contract Compliance Programs found more than 80 women were subject to pay disparities compared with male colleagues; the university agreed to pay $900,000 in back pay.

Campuses 
Nova Southeastern University has a main campus located in Davie, Florida, with several branch campuses throughout the state, and one in Puerto Rico.

Fort Lauderdale/Davie campus 

The main campus consists of 314 acres and is located in Davie, Florida. The main campus includes administrative offices, classroom facilities, library facilities (including the Alvin Sherman Library), health clinics, mental health clinics, Don Taft University Center, residence halls, cafeterias, computer labs, the bookstore, athletic facilities, and parking facilities. The Alvin Sherman Library, Research, and Information Technology Center is the largest library building in the state of Florida. The library was opened to the public in December 2001, and offers workshops on a variety of topics each semester online and at NSU campuses. The Halmos College of Natural Sciences and Oceanography operates at both the main campus and an additional campus at the entrance to Port Everglades.

The campus is home to both the College of Osteopathic Medicine, which confers the Doctor of Osteopathic Medicine (D.O.) degree, and the College of Allopathic Medicine, which confers the Doctor of Medicine (M.D.) degree. This makes Nova Southeastern the first institution in the Southeast to grant both M.D. and D.O. medical degrees.

In 2016, the Collaborative Research opened in a 215,000 square foot facility. In 2018, construction began on a 500-600 unit undergraduate residence with an additional parkade structure on campus. The College of Psychology and the College of Arts, Humanities and Social Sciences are based in the Maltz building on the Davie campus.

In 2021, HCA Florida University Hospital, along with a new medical office building and a new parking structure, opened adjacent to the main campus.

NSU University School

The main campus hosts the NSU University School. The University School is a fully accredited, independent, college preparatory school that serves grades pre-kindergarten through grade 12, and is located on the Davie campus. This school, often referred to as just the "University School", is organized into three academic sections: lower, middle, and upper schools. These represent, respectively, elementary, middle and high school divisions within the school.

Dania Beach Oceanographic campus 

The Dania Beach campus is located on 10 acres in the Dr. Von D. Mizell-Eula Johnson State Park and houses the Oceanographic Center. The Dania Beach campus includes the Center of Excellence for Coral Reef Ecosystems Research. Completed in 2012 at a cost of US$50 million, the center is the largest research facility dedicated to studying coral reefs in the United States.

North Miami Beach campus 

The College of Education is named after Abraham S. Fischler, who served as the second president of Nova University (prior to merging with Southeastern University). The Special Needs Dentistry Clinic moved to the North Miami Beach campus in 2013.

Tampa Bay regional campus 
The Tampa Bay regional campus is a newly constructed 27-acre, 325,000 square foot campus located in Clearwater, Florida. Construction began in March 2018 and was completed in August 2019. The Drs. Kiran and Pallavi Patel Family Foundation committed to a $200 million donation to support the development of the campus. The former Tampa Bay regional campus was previously located in Brandon, Florida. Approximately 1,200 students will be registered for classes during the Fall 2019 semester. The university expressed plans to offer additional programs at the Tampa Bay campus, including osteopathic medicine, anesthesiologist assistant, occupational therapy, physical therapy, and nursing.

Student education centers 
Nova Southeastern operates student education centers and satellite campuses in Fort Myers, Jacksonville, Miramar, Miami-Kendall Orlando, Palm Beach-Palm Beach Gardens, Tampa Bay-Clearwater, and San Juan, Puerto Rico. These centers provide computer labs, videoconferencing equipment, and other resources for distance students, who are not located near the main campus.

Academics 

Through its 15 colleges, the university awards associate, bachelor's, master's, doctoral, and professional degrees. The university offers 33 degrees at the doctoral level and master's degrees are offered in 52 subjects. About 175 programs of study are offered, with more than 250 majors. Additional programs of study include engineering and computing, arts, humanities and social sciences. Several degrees are offered online (distance education).

NSU maintains a Health Professions Division, currently composed of eight colleges, including two accredited medical schools. The College of Osteopathic Medicine operates the Center for Bioterrorism and All-Hazards Preparedness (CBAP), which is one of six training centers in the US funded by the Health Resources and Services Administration. Through the respective colleges, residency training is offered in medicine, dentistry and optometry.

Institutes and centers
In addition to its colleges, NSU has various other centers and institutes. NSU offers programs for families on parenting, preschool, primary education, and secondary education, which are provided through the Mailman Segal Institute for Early Childhood Studies. The Institute for Neuro Immune Medicine is located on both the main campus in Ft. Lauderdale and on the Kendall campus. This center aims to advance the science of treatment for individuals with neuro-inflammatory diseases via integration of education, research, and patient care.

Accreditation
The university is accredited by the Southern Association of Colleges and Schools and also has numerous additional specialized accreditations for its colleges and programs. The Center for Psychological Studies is accredited by the American Psychological Association and recognized by the Florida Department of Education. The NSU University School is accredited by AdvancED and recognized by the Florida Kindergarten Council and the Florida Council of Independent Schools. The College of Allopathic Medicine received Preliminary Accreditation by the Liaison Committee on Medical Education (LCME) on October 10, 2017, becoming the eighth M.D. degree granting medical school in Florida, with full accreditation on February 22, 2023. The business school is accredited by the International Assembly for Collegiate Business Education and the Association to Advance Collegiate Schools of Business.

Rankings 

NSU is ranked by the Washington Monthly as the 391st best national university. In 2015, NSU was ranked by The Economist at 290 of 1,275 colleges based on income of graduate, compared to expected income. In 2015, NSU was ranked 9th for diversity by U.S. News & World Report. In 2016, NSU was selected as one of 20 global universities by the Times Higher Education and World University that could challenge the elite and become a world renowned university by 2030. In 2019, NSU ranked 22nd in number of professional doctoral degrees awarded to minorities in the US. In 2000 and in 2014, Nova Southeastern University was ranked 3rd for highest total debt burden amongst its students.

Student life 

In Fall 2019, 20,576 students were attending Nova Southeastern University, including undergraduates, graduate students, and professional programs. About 71% of undergraduate students are female, and 29% are male. The average student age is 22 years, and 25% are from out-of-state, while the remaining 75% of students are from Florida. About 36% of students are Hispanic/Latino, 27% are White/non-Hispanic, 14% are black/African American, 11% are Asian, 3% identify as two or more races/ethnicities, and 4% of students are of unknown ethnicity. About 49% of students attend classes at the Davie Campus, whereas 30% attend class at other campuses and 21% take courses online. The North Miami Beach Campus accounts for about 5% of the student population.

The university is a designated Hispanic-serving institution, a federal grant program for institutions whose student body is at least 25% Hispanic/Latino.

Organizations 
There are over 100 clubs and organizations on campus for students. There are a total of 20 student government associations that form PanSGA with the addition of the College of Allopathic Medicine. The Nova Southeastern's Undergraduate Student Government Association is the primary organization for the government of the undergraduate student body. About 9-10% of students participate in the Greek Life system through a fraternity or sorority. There are a total of five fraternities on the campus and six sororities on the campus.

The school's student-run newspaper, The Current, is published weekly. There is also a school-sponsored, student-run radio station called "WNSU Radio X", which broadcasts in the evenings and weekends on 88.5 FM WKPX, a station owned by Broward County Public Schools. Radio X is a student-run radio station which was established in 1990 and began broadcasting over WKPX in 1998. Sharks United Television (SUTV) is a student-run media outlet at NSU.

Housing 

About 26% of students at NSU live in university owned or operated housing. The newest residence hall is the Rolling Hills Apartments, which opened in 2008. Rolling Hills Apartments is a renovated residence hall that was originally the "Best Western Rolling Hills Resort." This residence hall is for graduate and doctoral students. The oldest dorms, Farquhar, Founders, and Vettel, each house 55 students and were named in 1975 for founders of Nova University. In August 2019, Mako Hall opened that holds apartment style living accommodations with individual kitchen, bedroom, and bathroom on campus.

Student series 
Several projects have been established that allow students to voluntarily listen to speakers brought in from outside the campus. The Farquhar Honors College hosts the Distinguished Speakers Series, which brings experts and notable persons from diverse fields to the campus. Past speakers have included Salman Rushdie, Prime Minister Ehud Barak, Spike Lee, Maziar Bahari, Bob Woodward, Elie Wiesel, Paul Bremer, Dr. Jack Kevorkian, Desmond Tutu, and Tenzin Gyatso, The 14th Dalai Lama.

The Life 101 series brings leaders from business, entertainment, politics and athletics to Nova Southeastern University to share their life accomplishments and "life lessons" learned. Past speakers have included Dwayne Johnson, Wayne Huizenga, Vanessa L. Williams, Dan Abrams, Jason Taylor, Michael Phelps, James Earl Jones, and Alyssa Milano.

Athletics 

The Nova Southeastern (NSU) athletic teams are called the Sharks. The university is a member of the NCAA Division II ranks, primarily competing in the Sunshine State Conference (SSC) since the 2002–03 academic year. The Sharks previously competed in the Florida Sun Conference (FSC; now currently known as the Sun Conference since the 2008–09 school year) of the National Association of Intercollegiate Athletics (NAIA) from 1990–91 to 2001–02.

NSU competes in 16 intercollegiate varsity sports: Men's sports include baseball, basketball, cross country, golf, soccer, swimming & diving and track & field; while women's sports include basketball, cross country, golf, soccer, softball, swimming & diving, tennis, track & field and volleyball. Former sports included women's rowing until after the 2019–20 school year.

Accomplishments 
Since joining the NCAA in 2002, the NSU Sharks have produced several NCAA All-Region selections and NCAA All-Americans, and have been nationally ranked in numerous sports. The NSU Sharks have won four straight championships in women's golf from 2009 to 2012. In 2016, for the first time in school history, the NSU baseball team won the Division II National Championship.

Nickname 
Many athletic events at NSU take place at University Center Arena. In 2005, students voted for a new school mascot, and the student body selected the Sharks. NSU's athletic teams had previously been known as the Knights.

Notable alumni 

NSU has produced over 170,000 alumni, who live in all 50 US states and over 116 countries worldwide. Alumni work in various fields, including academia, government, research, and professional sports. Prominent alumni include Major League Baseball player J.D. Martinez of the Boston Red Sox, Isabel Saint Malo, the former Vice President of Panama, Marilyn Mailman Segal, prominent child psychologist, Ivy Dumont, first female Governor-General of the Bahamas, Tyler Cymet, internist, Cathy Areu, author and journalist, Somy Ali, former Bollywood actress and activist, Geisha Williams, former CEO of PG&E, Kristine Lefebvre, lawyer and contestant on The Apprentice, Scott W. Rothstein, lawyer, Syra Madad, epidemiologist and infectious disease control expert and, and Dr. Will Kirby, a dermatologist and television personality.

Research
Nova Southeastern University (NSU) is classified among "R2: Doctoral Universities – High research activity". One notable area of NSU's research looks at the impact of sharks on the health of the ocean.

NSU also has its research on other various fields such as biotechnology, life sciences, environment and social sciences. NSU faculty are funded by extramural grants of over $107 million for various projects to advance research works, academics. Their projects include basic, applied and clinical research projects on drug discoveries, mental health disorders oceanic studies.

Gallery

See also 
 Independent Colleges and Universities of Florida
 Workers Unionization Strike & Controversy

References

External links 

 
 Nova Southeastern athletics website

 
Universities and colleges in Broward County, Florida
Private universities and colleges in Florida
Educational institutions established in 1964
Universities and colleges accredited by the Southern Association of Colleges and Schools
Schools of public health in the United States
North Miami Beach, Florida
World War II airfields in the United States
1964 establishments in Florida
Universities and colleges formed by merger in the United States